The Civil War is the fifth studio album by experimental duo Matmos, released via Matador Records. It explores the boundaries between Americana, Medieval folk music and electronica. It features many live instruments such as drums, brass and guitars. A hurdy-gurdy is also sampled. There is also a satirical take on "Stars and Stripes Forever."

Critical reception
Review aggregator website Metacritic gives The Civil War a score of 77 out of 100 based on 22 critics, indicating "generally favorable reviews."

Heather Phares of AllMusic gave the album 4.5 stars out of 5, calling it "an album whose subtly oxymoronic title suggests the inherent contradictions of its sound." Mark Richardson of Pitchfork gave the album a 7.3 out of 10, saying, "As a technical achievement and as a piece of pure sound, The Civil War is inarguably Matmos' best record."

Track listing

References

External links
 

2003 albums
Matmos albums
Matador Records albums